Aerva is a genus of plants in the family Amaranthaceae. Its species are native to the palaeotropics, throughout continental Africa, Madagascar and smaller islands (Rodrigues, Mauritius, Socotra), through parts of the Middle East, India, and southeast Asia. Aerva javanica is an alien in northern Australia.

At least four species in the genus have acquired the  carbon fixation pathway.

Selected species
List of species within the genus sensu Thiv et al. (2006) & Hammer et al. (2017):
 Aerva congesta Balf. f.
 Aerva coriacea Schinz 
 Aerva glabrata Hook. f. 
 Aerva humbertii Cavaco
 Aerva javanica (Burm.f.) Schult.
 Aerva lanata (L.) Juss. ex Schult.
 Aerva leucura Moq.
 Aerva microphylla Moq.
 Aerva revoluta Balf.f.
 Aerva sanguinolenta (L.) Blume
 Aerva triangularifolia Cavaco

Taxa in synonymy
 Aerva artemisioides Vierh. & O.Schwartz ≡ Wadithamnus artemisioides (Vierh. & O.Schwartz) T.Hammer & R.W.Davis

References

External links

 
Amaranthaceae genera
Taxa named by Peter Forsskål
Taxonomy articles created by Polbot